Dolyna is a city located in Kalush Raion of Ivano-Frankivsk Oblast (region) in south-western Ukraine. It hosts the administration of Dolyna urban hromada, one of the hromadas of Ukraine. Population: . In 2001, population was around 20,900.

History
The city's history reaches the 10th century, making it one of oldest in the region. By the 14th century Dolyna became renowned for its salt mine. In 1349 the city came under the rule of the Kingdom of Poland, where it remained until 1772 (see Partitions of Poland). In 1525 Dolyna, or Dolina, as it is called in Polish, was granted city rights under the Magdeburg law and the right to trade salt similar to that of Kolomyia. In 1740 in the city there was a riot of opryshky (Ukrainian rebels).

In 1772 the city fell to Austrians and in 1791 it lost its status. During the second half of the 19th century a railroad line linking Stryi with Stanislaviv was led through the city. By the end of the 19th century big  fires destroyed the town completely. The first decade of the new century was dedicated to the revival of the town. After the collapse of Austria-Hungary, reborn Polish and Ukrainian states struggled for control over Dolyna in a fratricidal war won by Poles (see Polish-Ukrainian War). In the Second Polish Republic, the town, with population of almost 10 000, belonged to the Stanisławów Voivodeship and was the capital of the Dolina County. Neighboring villages were inhabited by German settlers, who came there in the times of Joseph II.

During World War II the city was occupied by the USSR (September 1939 - June 1941), Hungary (July 1941), and Germany (August 1941-1944).  During the German occupation, the Jewish population of Dolyna was murdered with only a few survivors.  Most were murdered in Dolyna itself, including on August 3, 1942 when German police and their Ukrainian police auxiliaries drove 3500 Jews into the market square.  They shot numerous children, sent some of the able bodied to labor camps, and took the remaining 2500 to the Jewish cemetery where they were shot.  After the Germans removed valuables from the bodies, they ordered locals to bury the bodies in a mass grave.  Some Jews had hidden and fled to the forests to join Jewish partisan groups.  However,  Ukrainian policeman and the Germans hunted down those in hiding and murdered them too. 

After the war, Dolyna became part of the Ukrainian SSR. In the 1950s, oil deposits were discovered in the region which by 1958 produced 65% of oil extracted in the Ukrainian SSR.  In the 1960s, the Dolynske oil field was the oil field that produced the largest amount of oil of the whole USSR.

Since 1991, Dolyna has been in independent Ukraine. Its oil field is one of the most powerful of Ivano-Frankivsk Oblast (region).

Until 18 July 2020, Dolyna was the administrative center of Dolyna Raion. The raion was abolished in July 2020 as part of the administrative reform of Ukraine, which reduced the number of raions of Ivano-Frankivsk Oblast to six. The area of Dolyna Raion was merged into Kalush Raion.

Notable People
Most prominent among the people hailing from the city was Myroslav Ivan Lubachivsky, Major Archbishop of Lviv and head of the Ukrainian Church. Among other notable inhabitants of Dolyna, there is Rudolf Regner, a hero of the Polish World War II resistance.

Other famous personalities associated with Dolyna are:
 Stanisław Jaworski - Polish film and theatre actor
 Antoni Kępiński - Polish psychiatrist and philosopher
 Ivan Levynskyi - Ukrainian architect
 Władysław Ogrodziński - Polish writer and journalist

Football
The city has a football club FC Naftovyk Dolyna.

Gallery

Sister cities
 Prairie Village, United States
, Grodzisk-Wielkopolski
, Nemodlin
, Zvyahail
, Saki

, Rubizhne

, Orhei

, Tirgu-Lapus

, Buyukcekmece

Location
Local orientation

Regional orientation

References

External links
 Dolyna at the Encyclopedia of Ukraine
 Unofficial city site 
 City history, description, and photos
 English-speaking forum of Dolyna 
 Photographs of Jewish sites in Dolyna

Cities in Ivano-Frankivsk Oblast
Stanisławów Voivodeship
Shtetls
Cities of district significance in Ukraine
Holocaust locations in Ukraine